Defending champions Diede de Groot and Aniek van Koot defeated Yui Kamiji and Lucy Shuker in the final, 7–5, 3–6, [10–2] to win the women's doubles wheelchair tennis title at the 2022 Australian Open.

Seeds

Draw

Bracket

References

External links
 Drawsheet on ausopen.com

Wheelchair Women's Doubles
2022 Women's Doubles